Huizhou Daya Bay Economic and Technological Development Zone is state-level economic development zone in 1993. The zone has a developed area of 6.98 square kilometres. It is situated in the north-eastern part of Daya Bay, located in Huizhou, Guangdong, facing the South China Sea and Shenzhen. The pillar industries include electronic and information, metals, energy, paper, petrochemical and warehousing.

Link
Huizhou Daya Bay Economic and Technological Development Zone (Chinese Version)

References

1993 establishments in China
Huizhou
Special Economic Zones of China